Yaginumaella lobata is a jumping spider.

Appearance
The species resembles Y. urbanii.

Name
The specific name is derived from the bulbous lobe of the palpal organ.

Distribution
Y. lobata is only known from Taiwan.

References

 Peng, Xian-Jin; Tso, I-Min & Li, Shu-Qiang (2002): Five new and four newly recorded species of jumping spiders from Taiwan (Araneae: Salticidae). Zoological Studies 41(1): 1-12. (PDF

Salticidae
Endemic fauna of Taiwan
Spiders of Taiwan
Spiders described in 2002